Sampat Saralis संपत सरल, commonly known as Sampat Saral, is a Hindi poet (kavi) and satirist. He was born on April 8, 1962, at Shekhawati in Rajasthan.

Education 

After studying from village Shekhawati and Jaipur, he has completed his master of Arts (Hindi) and B.Ed. from Rajasthan University.

Performance 

Samapat Saral  he has toured USA, Canada, Oman, Singapore, Hong Kong, UAE, Thailand, Saudi Arabia  and Nepal. . He performs in Kavi Sammelan and Mushayara across India and world.

Books 

 Chaaki Dekh Chunav Ki (Look at the pivot of Elections) 
 Chadmvibhusan

TV serials 

 Hum Hain Na
 Karam Dharam
 Chakkar Pe Chakkar
 Bapu Ji Ro Gigliye
 Beta Beti ke Lye

References

Hindi-language poets
1962 births
Living people